Thailand competed at the 2012 Asian Beach Games held in Haiyang, China from June 16 to 22, 2012.
Thailand won total 28 medals, including 13 golds, 9 silvers and 6 bronzes. It earned second position in the general medal table.

Medal summary

Medals table

Medalists

External links 
Official Site

References 

Nations at the 2012 Asian Beach Games
2012
Asian Beach Games